Lloyd Hobson (born 22 October 1985) is a South African cricketer. He played in one first-class and five List A matches for Boland and Eastern Province from 2008 to 2010.

References

External links
 

1985 births
Living people
South African cricketers
Boland cricketers
Eastern Province cricketers
Cricketers from Port Elizabeth